In mathematics, the Whitehead product is a graded quasi-Lie algebra structure on the homotopy groups of a space.

The relevant MSC code is: 55Q15, Whitehead products and generalizations.

Definition 
Given elements , the Whitehead bracket 

is defined as follows:

The product  can be obtained by attaching a -cell to the wedge sum

;

the attaching map is a map 

and

then compose their wedge with the attaching map, as

The homotopy class of the resulting map does not depend on the choices of representatives, and thus one obtains a well-defined element of

Grading
Note that there is a shift of 1 in the grading (compared to the indexing of homotopy groups), so  has degree ; equivalently,  (setting L to be the graded quasi-Lie algebra). Thus  acts on each graded component.

Properties

The Whitehead product satisfies the following properties:

 Bilinearity.  
 Graded Symmetry. 
 Graded Jacobi identity. 

Sometimes the homotopy groups of a space, together with the Whitehead product operation are called a graded quasi-Lie algebra; this is proven in  via the Massey triple product.

Relation to the action of  

For , this reduces to

This can also be seen by observing that the -cell of the torus  is attached along the commutator in the -skeleton .

Whitehead products on H-spaces 

For a path connected H-space, all the Whitehead products on  vanish. By the previous subsection, this is a generalization of both the facts that the fundamental groups of H-spaces are abelian,
and that H-spaces are simple.

Suspension 

All Whitehead products of classes ,  lie in the kernel of the suspension homomorphism

Examples

 , where  is the Hopf map.

This can be shown by observing that the Hopf invariant defines an isomorphism  and explicitly calculating the cohomology ring of the cofibre of a map representing . Using the Pontryagin–Thom construction there is a direct geometric argument, using the fact that the preimage of a regular point is a copy of the Hopf link.

Applications to ∞-groupoids 
The objects are the points in the space , morphisms are homotopy classes of paths between points, and higher morphisms are higher homotopies of those points.

The existence of the Whitehead product is the main reason why defining a notion of ∞-groupoids is such a demanding task.

See also
 Generalised Whitehead product
 Massey product
 Toda bracket

References

 
  
 
 

Homotopy theory
Lie algebras